We Are The South: Greatest Hits is a greatest hits album by 8Ball & MJG. It was released on May 18, 2008, by Koch Records, and includes many of the duo's best songs from Comin' Out Hard, On the Outside Looking In, Space Age 4 Eva, and Living Legends.

It peaked at #59 on the Billboard charts.

Critical reception
PopMatters wrote that "the new Greatest Hits album from the legendary Memphis duo draws completely from their peak period and sounds like the classic album that has eluded them their whole career rather than a 'best of' collection."

Track listing

References

2008 greatest hits albums
8Ball & MJG albums
Gangsta rap compilation albums